The 2001 Pacific typhoon season was the fourth and final consecutive year with below-average activity, making it the lowest four-year period of activity since 1976–1979, due to the presence of a strong La Niña that had persisted from 1998 to 2001. The season produced twenty-five named storms, sixteen typhoons and three super typhoons. It ran year-round in 2001, with most tropical cyclones in the northwestern Pacific Ocean tending between May and November.

However the first named storm, Cimaron, did not develop until May 9. Taiwan suffered the most destruction from typhoons this year, with Typhoons Toraji, Nari, and Lekima being responsible for nearly 300 deaths in that island alone, making it one of the deadliest typhoon seasons in recorded history in that island. In November, Typhoon Lingling impacted the Philippines, killing 171 people, making it one of the deadliest Philippine storms this century. The season ended with the formation of Tropical Storm Vamei during the last week of December. Vamei was notable for becoming the lowest latitude typhoon, at 1.4°N, ever to be observed in the Northwest Pacific.

The scope of this article is limited to the Pacific Ocean, north of the equator and west of the International Date Line. Storms that form east of the date line and north of the equator are called hurricanes; see 2001 Pacific hurricane season. Tropical Storms formed in the entire west pacific basin are assigned a name by the Tokyo Typhoon Center. Tropical depressions in this basin have the "W" suffix added to their number. Tropical depressions that enter or form in the Philippine area of responsibility are assigned a name by the Philippine Atmospheric, Geophysical and Astronomical Services Administration or PAGASA. This can often result in the same storm having two names.

Seasonal forecasts 

During the year, the Japan Meteorological Agency (JMA) issued advisories on tropical cyclones west of the International Date Line to the Malay Peninsula, and north of the equator, in its role as the official Regional Specialized Meteorological Center, as designated by the World Meteorological Organization in 1989. The JMA issued forecasts and analyses every six hours starting at midnight UTC using numerical weather prediction (NWP) and a climatological tropical cyclone forecast model. They used the Dvorak technique and NWP to estimate 10-minute sustained winds and barometric pressure. The JTWC also issued warnings on storms within the basin, operating from Pearl Harbor in Hawaii and supplying forecasts to the United States Armed Forces in the Indian and Pacific Oceans.

On January 31, Tropical Storm Risk (TSR) issued their extended range forecast for the Northwest Pacific in 2001, predicting near-average activity in terms of tropical storms, but a slightly below average in terms of typhoons. They predict that around 28 tropical storms would form, in which 17 of them would become typhoons, and 8 would further intensify to intense typhoons. TSR uses anomalous patterns of sea-surface temperatures (SSTs) over in the Niño 3.4 region (5°N-5°S, 120°W-170°W) during the August–September SST forecast as a predictor. With a predicted anomaly of -0.27 °C, a weak La Niña is expected — which tends to suppress tropical cyclone activity or intensity. On June 15, TSR issued their pre-season forecast, predicting a neutral typhoon season. Predicted tropical storm numbers have decreased to 26, but both their predicted typhoon and intense typhoon numbers have increased to 18 and 9, respectively. The key factor to this prediction is now due to the anticipated neutral value for the August–September SST forecast in the Niño 4 region (5°S – 5°N, 150°W – 160°E) of +0.27 °C.

Seasonal summary

The season ran with weak La Niña conditions during the first quarter of the year and near-normal conditions throughout the rest of the year, with average sea-surface temperatures in the Niño 3.4 region of around -0.3 °C. It was the final year of a rather strong La Niña episode that persisted throughout most of the Pacific Ocean since 1998. This was demonstrated with this season's tropical activity being more active than the previous three seasons, but overall tropical activity still remaining below average.

2001 opened with Tropical Storm Soulik, from the previous season, active in the Philippine Sea. Soulik strengthened into the first typhoon seen this year and reached its peak intensity as a Category 3-equivalent typhoon on January 3, before quickly dissipating the next day. The formation of Tropical Depression 01W (Auring), however, officially initiated the start of the annual typhoon season on February 17. No tropical cyclones developed until after two months later, when another tropical depression had developed to the southeast of the Philippines. Tropical cyclogenesis gradually increased when May arrived – with three tropical systems developing. Two of these systems were only recognised as minor tropical depressions, while the other strengthened to the first official named storm of this year, Cimaron, which moved through the Philippine archipelago in the middle of the month.

Systems

Tropical Depression 01W (Auring)

The PAGASA named the system, Auring. The JTWC followed suit and designated it 01W, six hours later. Auring moved westward and began traversing the Philippine archipelago of Visayas. By February 19, the PAGASA issued its final warning on Auring. The JTWC also issued its final advisory on the system on February 20. The JMA downgraded the system to a low-pressure area, and its remnants tracked northward, where it was last noted off the coast of the Ilocos Region on February 23.

Tropical Depression 01W (Auring) brought rainfall throughout most of Visayas and Mindanao. At least 18 people died, with most of these deaths due to landslides that occurred from the torrential rain. In Leyte and most of Mindanao, flooding submerged the homes of 159,785 people. Damages from crops and property have been estimated at ₱200 million (US$4.16 million).

Tropical Depression 02W (Barok)

The PAGASA began issuing advisories on Tropical Depression Barok on 06:00 UTC of April 16, located to the wast of Palau. Six hours later, the JTWC followed suit on initiating advisories, where they designated it as 02W. Barok moved in a northwestward direction well to the east of the Philippines without any intensification. By April 19, both agencies stopped warning on the system when the depression quickly deteriorated. Even though warnings were discontinued, its remnants continued to show signs of life with several bursts of convection. This prompted the JTWC to issue a Tropical Cyclone Formation Alert (TCFA) on April 21, however its convection significantly weakened.

Severe Tropical Storm Cimaron (Crising)

The system was upgraded to a tropical depression and was assigned as 03W by the JTWC on May 7, before the JMA followed suit in upgrading its status on May 9, and at the same time, was assigned the name Crising by PAGASA after it entered its responsibility area. The following day, Tropical Depression 03W intensified to a tropical storm and was given the name Cimaron by the JMA. Cimaron slowly began to transition into an extratropical cyclone due to a weakening trend with vertical shear as the storm accelerated northeastward.

Typhoon Chebi (Emong)

Rapid development occurred and the disturbance became identified as Tropical Depression 04W by the JTWC at 21:00 UTC. After entering the PAR and receiving the name Emong by PAGASA, the depression intensified into a tropical storm on June 20. Chebi headed northwest while being located east of the Philippines on June 21 at 06:00 UTC, and would later attain severe tropical storm intensity, before intensifying further to a typhoon the following day. A trough forced Chebi west and northwest where it made landfall near Fuzhou City, China. Chebi rapidly weakened while accelerating northward, and would degrade into an extratropical cyclone on June 24. It's remnants were last noted by the JMA and other weather centers before dissipating on June 30.

Chebi killed 82 people, mostly in China, and left $422 million (2001 USD), $457 million (2005 USD). Chebi's heavy rains and strong winds left nine people dead, 28 missing and $13 million (2001 USD) in damage in the Philippines. Four of the nine were from a Belizean freighter that sank during the storm. The Penghu Islands, which took the brunt of the typhoon, suffered considerable damage as 102 fishing boats sank and ten thousand people were left without power. The storm also crippled ground and air traffic. A rain laden typhoon, Chebi produced 100 millimeters of rain across Guangdong. About 73 people were killed in China, most of them in the southeastern province of Fujian. The storm also destroyed several thousand acres of crops, resulting in economic losses. In Ningde, about 321,400 houses were destroyed by the typhoon. About 22 people were killed in Hangzhou when a landslide burst through a construction wall.

Severe Tropical Storm Durian

The monsoon trough produced another disturbance that upgraded into a tropical depression to the west of Luzon on June 29. The tropical depression tracked northwestward while a subtropical ridge influenced the depression and caused it to upgrade to Tropical Storm Durian on June 30. Durian made landfall on the Leizhou Peninsula, before rapidly weakening as it continued in the same direction before the JTWC stopped advisories of the storm on July 2, with the JMA doing the same the following day.

78 casualties and $446 million (2001 USD) in damage can be attributed to Typhoon Durian hitting southern China on July 1 as an  typhoon. The name Durian was submitted by Thailand and refers to the Southeast Asian fruit of the same name.

Severe Tropical Storm Utor (Feria)

The depression strengthen into a tropical storm at 00:00 UTC on July 2. Utor tracked west-northwest from a peripheral ridge and developed further, after entering the Philippine Area of Responsibility, and attained severe tropical storm status the following day. Utor was centered  near northern Luzon and tracked northwesterly as it began to weaken. The storm made landfall near the east of Hong Kong on July 5 and quickly weakened before being last noted on July 7 by the JMA.

Utor, while not a very strong storm, brought heavy rain amounting to $297.2 million (2001 USD) in damage, as well as causing 203 fatalities.

Tropical Storm Trami (Gorio)

Bursts of deep convection near the center were observed on the 7th, although the system remained disorganized. Organization improved and by July 8, was upgraded to a tropical depression. Moving northwestward, the system gradually intensified, and the PAGASA began initiating advisories on 18:00 UTC of the same day, naming the system, Gorio. Six hours later, the JTWC already deemed the system as Tropical Depression 07W. Deep convection persisted to the west of its well-defined, but a partially exposed center. Thus, the system gained strength into a tropical storm, with the JMA naming it as Trami. By 12:00 UTC of July 11, Trami moved over Taiwan and into the Taiwan Strait, where Trami rapidly weakened and dissipated.

Trami mostly affected Taiwan with just rainfall. However, Kaohsiung and Pingtung counties experienced the heaviest rainfall in 40 years. In Kaohsiung City, streets were clogged with bonded cars due to severe flooding, and more than 100,000 homes were left without power. The floods resulted in only five deaths in the southern part of the city.

Tropical Depression 08W

The JTWC issued its second and final warning early the next day. The storm's remnants moved outside the basin early on July 12. The depression moved in a slow, erratic direction, and began moving east-northeastward. By July 18, the system was approaching a shortwave trough, causing it to weaken and dissipate the next day.

Typhoon Kong-rey

Continued consolidation of its convection prompted both the JTWC to classify it as a tropical storm on 18:00 UTC. The JMA followed suit six hours later and named it Kong-rey. By July 23, the JTWC upgraded Kong-rey to a typhoon while the JMA upgraded it to a severe tropical storm. A mid-latitude ridge to the east of Japan strengthened, causing Kong-rey to curve and move in a northeastward direction. Kong-rey reached its peak intensity on July 25, then slightly weakened afterwards. At the same time, the JMA had finally upgraded Kong-rey to a typhoon. On July 26, a redevelopment of a small eye caused Kong-rey to reach its second peak intensity for a short period of time. Increasing wind shear caused the typhoon to weaken the next day. Kong-rey was downgraded to a tropical storm on 00:00 UTC of July 28. Both agencies issued their final warning later that day when it had become extratropical. Its remnants was still tracked until it reached the southwestern Aleutian Islands on August 3.

Severe Tropical Storm Yutu (Huaning)

A tropical depression had developed to the east of the northern tip of Cagayan, Philippines on July 22. On the next day, the PAGASA began initiating advisories on the system also, and had named it Huaning. The system strengthened into a tropical storm in the same day and was named Yutu by the JMA. Yutu moved in a general westward direction and passed the extreme northern Philippine islands. Satellite imagery depicted that a tightly wrapped convective banding was circulating around a developing eye, signalling that Yutu was undergoing a phase of rapid deepening. Thus, the JTWC quickly upgraded Yutu to a 70-knot typhoon. The JMA, however, only classified it as a severe tropical storm. On 12:00 UTC of July 25, Yutu reached its peak intensity as a Category 2-equivalent typhoon. The system slowly weakened afterwards, and seven hours later, Yutu made landfall over the Dianbai District. Yutu significantly weakened and fully dissipated on July 26.

Upon its landfall, Yutu brought gusty winds and rainfall throughout the Guandong province and nearby areas. Xuwen County recorded  of rainfall for a 24-hour period from July 25–26. About 4,650 houses were destroyed in the province. Estimated damages were up to ¥700 million (US$109 million). No fatalities were reported, however ten people were injured by Yutu in Hong Kong.

Typhoon Toraji (Isang)

After organization and further development, the disturbance formed as Tropical Depression 11W and received the name Isang from PAGASA on July 25. The depression was far east of the Philippines as it tracked northwestward then west-northwestward. 11W intensified to tropical storm strength on July 27 east of Luzon. Toraji attained further to severe tropical storm status at 12:00 UTC before become a typhoon at 18:00 UTC the same day. Toraji moved north-northwesterly due to forming in a weakness in the subtropical ridge. Toraji weakened and was downgraded to a tropical depression while being near the coast of southeastern China on July 30, before making landfall that day. Toraji transitioned to an extratropical cyclone on August 1 before dissipating 2 days later.

Torrential rainfall produced by the storm triggered flash flooding and landslides across Taiwan, killing 200 people and leaving NT$7.7 billion (US$245 million) in damage. At least 30 people were killed in a village located in Nantou County which was completely buried by mud and rocks. In the wake of the storm, Taiwan's Premier, Chang Chun-hsiung criticized the excessive development of Taiwan and lack of heedance of possible negative effects for the significant loss of life from Toraji. He also initiated a reforestation project to avoid future disasters of a similar scale.

Typhoon Man-yi

The system developed into a tropical depression the next day, with the JTWC designating it as 12W.

The system gradually intensified as it moved northwest, with the JTWC considering Man-yi a minimal typhoon on the next day. The JMA, however, followed suit on August 4. At this time, deep convection was found to be developing near its eyewall and its cyclonic structure was becoming much more symmetrical. The JTWC quickly upgraded Man-yi to a high-end Category 3 typhoon. By 12:00 UTC, Man-yi reached its first initial peak strength as a Category 4-equivalent typhoon. Throughout the next day, Man-yi began to move in a northeastward direction as it dropped in intensity due to a phase of an eyewall replacement cycle. By August 6, Man-yi restrengthened and reached its second peak intensity. Thereafter, Man-yi began to weaken as its eye began to expand — and had an annular structure. On August 8, cold dry air began to wrap into the storm as it was undergoing extratropical transition. The JTWC issued their final advisory later that day, but the JMA still tracked the system until 12:00 UTC of August 9.

Tropical Storm Usagi

A weak tropical depression had persisted in the South China Sea, just west off Luzon on August 8. On the next day, operationally, the JTWC began on issuing advisories on the system as Tropical Depression 13W. However post-analysis showed that the system had already intensified into a tropical depression several hours earlier. Despite with an exposed center, a weak banding feature began to develop around it. Organization of the 13W improved slightly, and by August 10, the system had intensified into a tropical storm, with the JMA naming it Usagi. By 18:00 UTC, Usagi moved inland Vietnam, just to the south of Hanoi, and therefore the JTWC issued its final advisory on the system. The storm continued moving westward over land until it was last noticed by the JMA on August 11.

The storm brought heavy rainfall and flash flooding mostly in Vietnam and Thailand. Usagi had worsened flooding in Vietnam in the month of August, with some provinces such as An Giang and Đồng Tháp being raised to flood Alarm 3 – which is emergency flood condition, due to widespread flooding that is uncontrollable. Effects from the storm were much more worse in Thailand. 200,000 hectares of farmland were submerged and thousands of homes were destroyed, leaving an estimated 450,000 people homeless. Deforestation in the mountainous areas of Phetchabun province brought in massive mudslides, especially in the Lom Sak District where its effects were much worse. At least 176 people have perished from the storm in Thailand, with most of these fatalities recorded in that district alone.

Typhoon Pabuk

On August 13, the JMA started to track a tropical depression that was embedded to the monsoon to the north-northwest of Saipan. Due to its rapid development, the JTWC issued a TCFA. The JTWC began issuing advisories; thereafter, giving the designation of 14W. All agencies upgraded 14W to a tropical storm the next day, after satellite imagery depicted a well-defined LLCC along with gale-force winds to the south of it. The JMA gave the storm the name Pabuk. Moving northwestward, Pabuk gradually intensified, and the JTWC upgraded the system to a typhoon on August 15; the JMA did the same 24 hours later. By August 17, Pabuk briefly reached its initial peak strength as a low-end Category 2 typhoon as it moved west-northwest before slowly weakening. During the next day, Pabuk began to re-intensify as a banding eye feature began to develop. Satellite animated imagery showed an eyewall forming with deep convection. The typhoon grew in size, and its eye became irregular, hinting on a weakening trend while moving north northeastward. Pabuk weakened to tropical storm intensity when it hit the southern coast of Japan, south of Osaka, on 12:00 UTC of August 21. On August 22, both the JMA and the JTWC issued its final advisory after it became extratropical.

Pabuk brought heavy rainfall in the southern part of Honshu, which flooded many homes and disrupting sea and air travel. As the typhoon was approaching, the JMA warned on heavy winds and strong gusts along the southwestern and western coastline of Japan. Around 70 homes were flooded in the island of Amami Ōshima alone. Moreover, the launch of the next-generation rocket H-IIA was also halted due to stormy conditions. Throughout Japan, the storm resulted in eight fatalities and 141 injured people. 917 hectares of fields were damaged. Total damages from the typhoon amounted to ¥630 million (US$5.55 million).

Tropical Depression 15W

Six hours later, the JTWC followed suit and began issuing advisories, giving the designation of 15W. The system slowly intensified within the next day. Despite bring predicted that the system would intensify into a tropical storm, the JTWC indicated that the system was beginning to merge with a frontal boundary. Afterwards, 15W re-curved and began moving northwestward until it neared Hokkaido on 00:00 UTC of August 28, when the system was absorbed by a stationary front.

Typhoon Wutip

A tropical disturbance that was embedded in a broad monsoonal circulation developed in the Philippine Sea on August 25. The JMA classified the system as a tropical depression on the next day. Early on August 27, the JTWC followed suit and began initiating advisories on Tropical Depression 16W, after improved organisation and increased convection. 16W quickly strengthened into a tropical storm thereafter, with the JMA naming it Wutip.

By August 28, an eye feature began to develop, forcing both agencies to quickly upgrade Wutip to a typhoon. Rapid deepening ensued for the rest of the day, and Wutip had already reached Category 4 typhoon intensity on 18:00 UTC of the same day. By August 30, Wutip began to weaken after its cloud tops began to warm and a reduction of convection. Wutip rapidly weakened down to tropical storm intensity by September 1, when it was already interacting with drier air, making its LLCC become exposed. Both the JMA and the JTWC issued their final advisory on 18:00 UTC of September 2, when it had weakened into an extratropical gale.

Tropical Storm Sepat

Sepat originated from an extensive monsoon trough that spawned multiple vortices on August 19, to the south of Pohnpei. After moving east-northeastward in a few days, the JTWC issued a TCFA after its circulation improved in organisation on August 26. The JMA classified the system as a tropical depression around the same time. By August 27, the JTWC began initiating advisories, designating the system as Tropical Depression 17W. Now moving in a rather north-northwestward direction, 17W gained strength. Both the JMA and the JTWC upgraded the system to a tropical storm on 18:00 UTC. The JTWC had upped the system's intensity to 45 knots, hinting the Sepat had already reached its peak intensity. The JMA noted Sepat's peak intensity early on the next day. Overall convection around the storm's center had significantly decreased thereafter. On August 29, a satellite passing revealed that most of its convection had already scattered, prompting the JTWC to lower Sepat's intensity to minimal tropical storm strength. At this point, Sepat had moved far north over cooler waters. The JTWC issued its final advisory on 00:00 UTC of August 30 when they noted that it had become extratropical. The JMA followed suit twelve hours later.

Tropical Storm Fitow

Initially an area of thunderstorms formed west of Luzon late on August 26, possibly due to the remains of former Tropical Depression Jolina. It moved west-northwest over northeastern Hainan late on August 29, before becoming a tropical storm 24 hours later. Early on August 31, the tropical storm began to drift north towards China. That evening, it struck Dongxing before weakening back into a tropical depression on September 1 and dissipating the following day.

Excessive rains fell in mainland China, with locations in Changjiang county measuring up to 831.1 mm in the 3 day period ending late on August 31. Total economic losses in Hainan were near 1.367 billion yuan (US$201.7 million). In all, 3680 houses were nearly destroyed, four died, and 3.5 million people were impacted by the weak tropical storm.

Typhoon Danas

Due to gradual development, the JTWC issued their first warning on 00:00 UTC of September 3, classifying the system as Tropical Depression 19W. Convective organisation continued to increase throughout the day, and both the JMA and JTWC upgraded the system to a tropical storm, naming it Danas. Moving westward, due to a subtropical ridge located to its north, Danas quickly intensified. The JTWC upgraded Danas to a minimal typhoon by 18:00 UTC of September 4, while the JMA did the same six hours later. As the typhoon began moving poleward, satellite imagery depicted on a development of a small eye with good convective banding. Hence, Danas intensified to a Category 2 typhoon. The typhoon maintained its intensity for the next 18 hours, until its eye became cloud-filled. Danas curved westward until a mid-latitude trough had weakened the ridge, causing the storm to move in a north-northeastward direction. The typhoon began to rapidly weaken, and by 00:35 UTC of September 11, Danas had already made landfall just to the southwest of Yokosuka. After crossing the eastern portion of Honshu, Danas weakened to a tropical storm. Both the JMA and the JTWC issued its final advisory on Danas on September 12, when it transitioned into an extratropical cyclone. Its remnants reached the Aleutian Islands two days later.

On September 10, Danas spawned a tornado near the city of Ochiai, just outside Tokyo. Along its track, the tornado damaged roofs, downed trees and injured one person. Following an assessment of the damage, the Tokyo District Meteorological Observatory ranked it as an F1 on the Fujita scale. According to reliable records, this was the eleventh tornado to touch down in the Kantō region. The town of Nikkō had recorded  of rainfall over a four-day period. More than 140 domestic and international flights were canceled due to extreme winds and torrential rainfall. Throughout Japan, Danas was responsible for eight fatalities and injured 48 people. Damages from the storm amounted to ¥1.11 billion (US$9.79 million).

Typhoon Nari (Kiko)

On September 5, a tropical depression developed northeast of Taiwan. Weak currents, which were prevalent throughout its lifetime, caused it to drift to the northeast where it became a tropical storm on the 6th. Nari stalled near Okinawa, and became a typhoon on the 7th. Over the next 5 days, Nari executed a triple loop over open waters, reaching a peak of  winds before weakening to a tropical storm on the 14th. It restrengthened to a typhoon, and as it continued southwestward, Nari reached  winds before hitting northeastern Taiwan on the 16th. The storm drifted across the island, emerging into the South China Sea on the 18th as a tropical depression. It continued westward, and finally made landfall east of Hong Kong as a  tropical storm on the 20th before dissipating as a tropical depression near the southern Chinese coasts.

Typhoon Vipa

The origins of Vipa can be tracked back from an upper-level low that had developed near Wake Island. The low began to interact with the monsoonal flow to its southwest, making it form a "monsoonal gyre" type system. On 00:00 UTC of September 17, deep convection wrapping its LLCC led to the formation of a tropical depression, with the JTWC designating it as 21W. Organisation ensued until the JTWC upgraded 21W to a tropical storm, eighteen hours later. However the JMA did not upgrade it until September 18, when they named it as Vipa. Satellite imagery depicted a small, cloud-filled eye, and thus, the JTWC upgraded the system to a minimal typhoon. The JMA, however, only classified Vipa as a severe tropical storm at this point. Vipa began to weaken as the JTWC signalised the beginning of an extratropical transition. However, its eye had enlarged, and Vipa reached its second peak intensity. The JMA briefly classified Vipa as a typhoon on September 20. By September 21, Vipa's eyewall began to deteriorate due to dry air. Both agencies issued their final advisory that day when Vipa had already transitioned into an extratropical cyclone. Its remnants was last noted in the Bering Sea two days later.

The name Vipa was changed to the correct spelling Wipha in 2002.

Typhoon Francisco

The JTWC followed suit on the next day, when they began issuing advisories on Tropical Depression 22W. 22W moved in a slow westward direction, when the JTWC upgraded the system to a tropical storm. By 00:00 UTC of September 20, the JMA followed suit and named it Francisco. Throughout the day, the convection had gradually build up, prompting the JTWC to quickly upgrade the storm to a typhoon by 12:00 UTC. Continued development caused Francisco to reach Category 2 typhoon intensity, as it began moving northward. Francisco reached its peak intensity that day, with a minimum barometric pressure of 945 hPa. However, by September 24, Francisco's convection had weakened, signalling a phase of rapid weakening. Both agencies downgraded Francisco to a tropical storm on the next day and issued their final advisories when the storm was becoming extratropical. Francisco's extratropical remnants was last seen on September 27 when it crossed the International Dateline.

Typhoon Lekima (Labuyo)

Late on September 19, an area of convection associated with a monsoon trough had developed east of Luzon. By 00:00 UTC of September 22, both the JMA and the JTWC began tracking on the system, when it developed into a tropical depression, designating it as 23W. The PAGASA followed suit and gave the local name Labuyo. Later that day, the system quickly organised into a tropical storm while raining quasi-stationary, with the JMA naming it as Lekima. Subsequently, the storm began to move in a west-northwestward motion. With steady development, Lekima reached typhoon intensity on September 23. Satellite imagery had later depicted a small eye that was surrounded by convective bands. Lekima made landfall near the city of Dawu, nine hours later. Shortly thereafter, due to the mountainous terrains of Taiwan, Lekima's structure had rapidly deteriorated and the typhoon had weakened back into a tropical storm. On September 27, Lekima further weakened to a tropical depression as it moved further north of the island. However, the JTWC re-upgraded Lekima back to a minimal tropical storm for a twelve-hour period on September 28, before weakening again as it moved over the western waters of the island. Lekima moved northward, then northeastward, before dissipating on September 30.

The typhoon caused severe impacts in Taiwan as what Nari did a few weeks earlier. Torrential rainfall was experienced throughout many counties, and even some were recorded in the Fujian province. 5,600 people experienced lossage of power while landslides blocked highways due to the slow and erratic movement of the storm. Two fishermen drowned at sea with another person on board presumed drowned. In the Philippine archipelago of Luzon, one person drowned in a river due to heavy rainfall. Another fatality was seen in mainland China, where a person died in the province of Zhejiang due to a landslide on September 29.

Typhoon Krosa

A rapidly developing area of convection near Guam led to the formation of Tropical Depression 24W on October 3. Deep convection continued to form and the system strengthened into a tropical storm the next day, with the JMA naming it as Krosa. Krosa moved in a quickly paced northwestward direction and entered an area of favourable environments. Later that day, the JMA upgraded Krosa to a severe tropical storm, and quickly into typhoon on October 5. Krosa began to curve northward, then northeastward thereafter, when its convective structure had slightly weakened. At this time, the JMA considered Krosa to reach its peak intensity. Within the next two days, Krosa continued to weaken as it encountered increasing wind shear from the mid-latitude westerlies. By October 9, both the JMA and the JTWC issued their final warning on Krosa, as the storm moved into the baroclinic zone and became extratropical.

Typhoon Haiyan (Maring)

Tropical Depression 25W formed over the Philippine Sea on October 11. The PAGASA named it as Maring 3 hours later. Maring steadily moved northwards due to an intensifying high-pressure area moving southwestwards, as the JTWC upgraded it to a tropical storm on October 13. In the same time, Maring became Tropical Storm Haiyan. The next day, the three agencies, upgraded it to a typhoon. Typhoon Haiyan reached peak intensity with winds equivalent to Category 2 strength on October 15. As the high-pressure moved westwards, Haiyan rapidly weakened to a minimal typhoon and moved westwards too, affecting Taiwan. Haiyan finally dissipated on October 18.

Throughout Japan and the Ryukyu Islands, two people were killed by the typhoon and another was injured. Damage from the storm amounted to 296.024 million yen (US$3.4 million).

Typhoon Podul

Typhoon Podul originated from an area of convection located near Pohnpei on October 16. The system experienced vertical wind shear before strengthening to a tropical depression on October 18, before upgrading further to a tropical storm on October 20. The JMA however, upgraded the storm the following day to Typhoon Podul, as the storm shifted north-northeastward after making a half-counterclockwise turn.

Podul underwent steady intensification while its well-defined eye had developed on October 23. As it continued its northwestward trek, satellite imagery showed that Podul underwent a concentric eyewall cycle on the 24th. Podul recurved and accelerated north-northeast as it began to rapidly weaken from dry air and cold air advection and transitioned to an extratropical cyclone on the 28th before dissipating the next day.

Typhoon Lingling (Nanang)

A tropical depression formed in the Philippine Sea on November 5. It moved westward, hitting the Philippines on the 6th. The depression strengthened over the archipelago, becoming a tropical storm on the 7th. Lingling continued to intensify, reaching a peak of  winds on the 10th in the South China Sea. The next day, the typhoon hit central Vietnam as a  typhoon, and dissipated on the 12th.

Lingling, like most typhoons, brought torrential rains and flooding, resulting in 171 deaths in the Philippines (with 118 missing) and 18 deaths in Vietnam.

Tropical Depression 28W (Ondoy)

Convection slowly deepened and the disturbance's structure began to consolidate. By 06:00 UTC of November 17, the JMA upgraded the system to a tropical depression. Animated satellite imagery revealed that its center became elongated with continued development of convection. This prompted the JTWC to begin issuing advisories as a tropical depression six hours later, giving the designation 28W. Maintaining its intensity, 28W tracked westward and entered the Philippine Area of Responsibility on November 20, with PAGASA to start issuing bulletins and naming it Ondoy. Shortly thereafter, Ondoy's center became partially exposed, with the JTWC downgrading the system back to a tropical depression. Within the next two days, Ondoy completed a loop to the east of Samar Island, and shifted its movement north-northwestward. The JTWC issued its final advisory on 18:00 UTC of November 24, however both the JMA and PAGASA still tracked the system until November 25.

Tropical Depression 29W (Pabling)

By the next day, the system began to drift eastward, with satellite imagery depicting a convective banding feature with some deep convection. The JTWC upgraded the system to a tropical depression and issued its first advisory on 06:00 UTC of November 20, receiving the designation 29W. 29W intensified into a tropical storm by the JTWC on 00:00 UTC of November 21, when the system's vortex became well-defined. By the next day, the storm entered the western portion of the Philippine area of responsibility, with PAGASA giving the name Pabling. On November 23, the JTWC downgraded Pabling back to a tropical depression after the system encountered increasing wind shear. The JTWC issued its final advisory shortly thereafter, when the storm was located just off the southern tip of Palawan. Pabling slowly dissipated the next day when it emerged in the waters of the Sulu Sea.

Tropical Storm Kajiki (Quedan)

In the first few days of December, an area of convection developed to the south of Guam. By December 4, both the JMA and the PAGASA upgraded the system into a tropical depression, with the PAGASA naming it Quedan. After deep convection was seen developing from multi-spectral imagery, the JTWC followed suit and began issuing advisories on 00:00 UTC of December 5 — giving the identifier of 30W. On the same day, the system intensified into a tropical storm, with the JMA naming it as Kajiki. Kajiki moved in a west-northwestward direction, traversing the islands of Visayas. By December 7, Kajiki emerged to the South China Sea, where unfavorable wind shear weakened the system. At this point, the storm's center started to become exposed and the storm's structure started to deteriorate. Both the JTWC and the JMA downgraded Kajiki to a tropical depression on the next day. The JMA tracked Kajiki until it neared the eastern coast of Vietnam on December 9.

In the Philippines, Kajiki (Quedan) brought only light to moderate rainfall over Visayas. Only two people were dead, while a total of 6,400 people were displaced, according to Agence France-Presse. Even though Kajiki remained far away from China, heavy rainfall from the storm's outflow was seen in the Hainan and Guandong provinces. In Xuwen County,  of rainfall was recorded in a 24-hour period from December 9 to 10. Qiongzhong County received the highest amount of precipitation, with a recorded . In Hainan, the heavy rainfall mostly led to agricultural losses, damaging up to ¥90.57 million (US$14 million).

Tropical Storm 31W

Operationally the same system as Typhoon Faxai, an area of unorganised convection in a region of weak to moderate vertical wind shear had persisted to the southwest of Pohnpei on December 10. By 12:00 UTC of the same day, the JTWC upgraded the system to Tropical Depression 31W. Satellite imagery and animations showed that there were multiple centers within the large-scale center, which made it difficult to track. By December 12, the system finally gained convection near its center. 31W briefly reached tropical storm intensity by the JTWC on 18:00 UTC of the same day. The storm was still difficult to track, which made one warning relocating the storm's center near the island of Kosrae. However, after post-analysis, this center was a newly developed center that originated from the same surface trough of 31W. This new center eventually became Tropical Storm Faxai.

Typhoon Faxai

Typhoon Faxai originated from a low-latitude monsoon trough in the Caroline Islands that was developed from the remnants of 31W through post-analysis on December 13, 2001. The system would later become a tropical depression, giving it the initial designated name 31W by the JTWC. The tropical depression upgraded to a tropical storm by the JTWC on December 15, before the JMA follows suit on December 16, giving the storm the name Faxai. Tropical Storm Faxai remained stationed around Kosrae for several days before slowly moving in eastward motion. The storm then drifted west-northwestward and became more organized. Faxai began to rapidly intensify and on December 22, became the year's third super typhoon.

The eye became cloud-filled by 06:00 UTC as the typhoon started to weaken. Its convective eye was replaced by a banding eye feature. Faxai recurved over the island of Agrihan on December 24, and during that day, began to transition into an extratropical cyclone. The storm degraded as it rapidly weakened and on Christmas Day, a significant decrease of deep clouds and bands occurred. The JTWC issued its final bulletin as it declared that Faxai became extratropical and later dissipated. It's remnants were noted on December 26, 2001, by the JMA.

Initially Faxai was classified as part of Tropical Depression 31W, but post-analysis considers the early part of Faxai's life a separate storm. As such, Faxai was classified as 33W in post-analysis. An indirect death occurred in the island and electrical power was knocked by the heavy rainfall. A 69-year-old man drowned in Gun Beach from strong currents across the shoreline on December 22.

Tropical Storm Vamei

It is extremely unusual to see tropical development this close to the equator. On December 27 it was upgraded to Tropical Storm Vamei, and shortly thereafter it made landfall in Malaysia. Emerging into the Indian Ocean on December 29 as a Tropical Depression, it briefly re-strengthened before dissipating on January 1.

Offshore of Malaysia, two U.S. Navy ships in Vamei's eyewall were damaged by strong winds. Vamei brought strong winds and heavy rainfall to Malaysia, where rainfall reached over 200 mm (8 in) in Senai. Additionally, monsoonal moisture, influenced by the storm, produced moderate to heavy precipitation across various regions of peninsular Malaysia. Along Gunung Pulai, the rainfall caused a landslide which destroyed four houses and killed five people. Damage from the flooding was estimated at RM13.7 million (2001 MYR, $3.6 million 2001 USD). The Malaysian government provided affected families up to RM5,000 (2001 MYR, $1,300 2001 USD) in assistance for food, clothing, and repairs. Vamei also brought heavy rainfall to Singapore, which caused air traffic disruptions at the Singapore Changi Airport.

Other systems

On May 6, the JMA tracked a weak tropical depression off the northeastern coast of Mindanao. The system degenerated into a low-pressure area the next day.

A tropical depression was briefly tracked by the Central Weather Bureau of Taiwan in the middle of May. On May 14, a tropical disturbance had developed off the coast of Vietnam. With gradual development, the JTWC issued a TCFA two days later. The system was in a marginal environment for development, however the JTWC canceled their TCFA when the system already moved onshore in the Nam Dinh province early on May 17. The Taiwan weather bureau only classified the system as a tropical depression in one of their bulletins.

On June 16, the PAGASA began initiating advisories on Tropical Depression Darna, that has developed just off the eastern coast of Luzon. As the system moved near the extreme northern portion of the archipelago, the system began in a north-northeastward trajectory towards Taiwan. On June 19, the JMA followed suit on classifying Darna to a tropical depression, however, being located in an area of weakly sheared environment, the system rapidly weakened and dissipated.

The depression moved in a west-northwestward track until it was lasted noted to the east of Taiwan. Presumably related from the previous system, the JMA began to track another tropical depression that had developed near Shanghai on August 5. The system emerged to the Yellow Sea and impacted the Korean Peninsula on August 7, before dissipating on the next day. This tropical depression brought heavy rainfall across eastern China, with Huangpu District, Shanghai getting  of rainfall. Due to this, 30,000 houses were destroyed, and moreover, the system produced a tornado near the area.

On August 16, the PAGASA started to track Tropical Depression Jolina to the west of Dagupan. The depression slowly meandered in the place until its system's center became exposed, and dissipated on August 21.

On October 20, a tropical depression had developed a couple hundred miles east of the coast of Vietnam. The JTWC issued a TCFA when the system was embedded in a broad area of convection. However, this was cancelled the next day when the system moved over Vietnam and dissipated. The tropical depression brought torrential rains all over Vietnam, which worsened the flooding that has been existing since August. 39 people have died with the added effects from the system, and damage totals from the overall flooding had reached ₫1.5 trillion (US$66.6 million).

Storm names
Within the North-western Pacific Ocean, both the Japan Meteorological Agency (JMA) and the Philippine Atmospheric, Geophysical and Astronomical Services Administration assign names to tropical cyclones that develop in the Western Pacific, which can result in a tropical cyclone having two names. While the Philippine Atmospheric, Geophysical and Astronomical Services Administration assigns names to tropical cyclones which move into or form as a tropical depression in their area of responsibility located between 135°E and 115°E and between 5°N-25°N even if the cyclone has had an international name assigned to it. The names of significant tropical cyclones are retired, by both PAGASA and the Typhoon Committee. Should the list of names for the Philippine region be exhausted then names will be taken from an auxiliary list of which the first ten are published each season.

International names

During the season 26 named tropical cyclones developed in the Western Pacific and were named by the Japan Meteorological Agency, when it was determined that they had become tropical storms. These names were contributed to a list of a 140 names submitted by the fourteen members nations and territories of the ESCAP/WMO Typhoon Committee.

This is the only time that the names "Vipa" and "Vamei" were used. The former's spelling was corrected to "Wipha" in 2002, while the latter was retired.

Philippines 

The Philippine Atmospheric, Geophysical and Astronomical Services Administration uses its own naming scheme for tropical cyclones in their area of responsibility. PAGASA assigns names to tropical depressions that form within their area of responsibility and any tropical cyclone that might move into their area of responsibility. Should the list of names for a given year prove to be insufficient, names are taken from an auxiliary list, the first 10 of which are published each year before the season starts. Starting in 2001, new sets of names are implemented. The names not retired from this list would be used again in the 2005 season.

Retirement

The name Vamei was retired by the ESCAP/WMO Typhoon Committee. The name Peipah was chosen to replace Vamei. The name "Nanang" was retired by PAGASA and was replaced by Nando for 2005.

Season effects
This table lists all the storms that developed in the western Pacific Ocean to the west of the International Date Line during the 2001 season. It includes their intensity, duration, name, landfalls, deaths, and damages. All damage figures are in 2001 USD. Damages and deaths from a storm include when the storm was a precursor wave or extratropical low.

|-
| 01W (Auring) ||  || bgcolor=#| || bgcolor=#| || bgcolor=#| || Philippines ||  || 18 ||
|-
| 02W (Barok) ||  || bgcolor=#| || bgcolor=#| || bgcolor=#| || None || None || None ||
|-
| TD ||  || bgcolor=#| || bgcolor=#| || bgcolor=#| || Philippines || None || None ||
|-
| TD ||  || bgcolor=#| || bgcolor=#| || bgcolor=#| || Vietnam || None || None ||
|-
| Cimaron (Crising) ||  || bgcolor=#| || bgcolor=#| || bgcolor=#| || Philippines, Taiwan || $ || None ||
|-
| Darna ||  || bgcolor=#| || bgcolor=#| ||  bgcolor=#| || Philippines || Unknown || None ||
|-
| Chebi (Emong) ||  || bgcolor=#| || bgcolor=#| || bgcolor=#| || Philippines, China, Taiwan || $ ||  ||
|-
| Durian ||  || bgcolor=#| || bgcolor=#| || bgcolor=#| || China, Vietnam || $ ||  ||
|-
| Utor (Feria) ||  || bgcolor=#| || bgcolor=#| || bgcolor=#| || Philippines, China, Taiwan || $ ||  ||
|-
| Trami (Gorio) ||  || bgcolor=#| || bgcolor=#| || bgcolor=#| || Philippines, Taiwan, East China || Unknown ||  ||
|-
| 08W ||  || bgcolor=#| || bgcolor=#| || bgcolor=#| || None || None || None ||
|-
| TD ||  || bgcolor=#| || bgcolor=#| ||  bgcolor=#| || None || Unknown || None ||
|-
| Kong-rey ||  || bgcolor=#| || bgcolor=#| || bgcolor=#| || None || None || None ||
|-
| Yutu (Huaning) ||  || bgcolor=#| || bgcolor=#| || bgcolor=#| || Philippines, Vietnam, South China ||  || None || 
|-
| Toraji (Isang) ||  || bgcolor=#| || bgcolor=#| || bgcolor=#| || Philippines, Taiwan, East China || $ ||  ||
|-
| Man-yi ||  || bgcolor=#| || bgcolor=#| || bgcolor=#| || Mariana Islands || $ || None ||
|-
| TD ||  || bgcolor=#| || bgcolor=#| ||  bgcolor=#| || Taiwan, Ryukyu Islands || None || None ||
|-
| TD ||  || bgcolor=#| || bgcolor=#| ||  bgcolor=#| || East China, Korean Peninsula || None|| None ||
|-
| Usagi ||  || bgcolor=#| || bgcolor=#| || bgcolor=#| || South China, Vietnam, Laos || $ ||  || 
|-
| Pabuk ||  || bgcolor=#| || bgcolor=#| || bgcolor=#| || Mariana Islands, Japan ||  ||  || 
|-
| Jolina ||  || bgcolor=#| || bgcolor=#| ||  bgcolor=#| || Philippines || None || None ||
|-
| TD ||  || bgcolor=#| || bgcolor=#| ||  bgcolor=#| || None || None|| None ||
|-
| TD ||  || bgcolor=#| || bgcolor=#| ||  bgcolor=#| || None || None|| None ||
|-
| 15W ||  || bgcolor=#| || bgcolor=#| ||  bgcolor=#| || None || None || None ||
|-
| Wutip ||  || bgcolor=#| || bgcolor=#| || bgcolor=#| || None || None || None ||
|-
| Sepat ||  || bgcolor=#| || bgcolor=#| || bgcolor=#| || None || None || None ||
|-
| Fitow ||  || bgcolor=#| || bgcolor=#| || bgcolor=#| || South China || $ ||  ||
|-
| Danas ||  || bgcolor=#| || bgcolor=#| || bgcolor=#| || Japan || $ ||  || 
|-
| Nari (Kiko) ||  || bgcolor=#| || bgcolor=#| || bgcolor=#| || Japan, Taiwan, East China || $ ||  ||
|-
| TD ||  || bgcolor=#| || bgcolor=#| ||  bgcolor=#| || South China || None|| None ||
|-
| TD ||  || bgcolor=#| || bgcolor=#| ||  bgcolor=#| || Taiwan, Ryukyu Islands || None|| None ||
|-
| TD ||  || bgcolor=#| || bgcolor=#| ||  bgcolor=#| || South China, Vietnam || None|| None ||
|-
| Vipa ||  || bgcolor=#| || bgcolor=#| || bgcolor=#| || Japan || None || None ||
|-
| Francisco ||  || bgcolor=#| || bgcolor=#| || bgcolor=#| || None || None || None ||
|-
| Lekima (Labuyo) ||  || bgcolor=#| || bgcolor=#| || bgcolor=#| || Philippines, Taiwan, East China || Unknown ||  || 
|-
| Krosa ||  || bgcolor=#| || bgcolor=#| || bgcolor=#| || Mariana Islands || None || None ||
|-
| Haiyan (Maring) ||  || bgcolor=#| || bgcolor=#| || bgcolor=#| || Taiwan, Japan || $ ||  ||
|-
| Podul ||  || bgcolor=#| || bgcolor=#| || bgcolor=#| || Caroline Islands || None || None ||
|-
| TD ||  || bgcolor=#| || bgcolor=#| ||  bgcolor=#| || Vietnam ||  ||  ||
|-
| Lingling (Nanang) ||  || bgcolor=#| || bgcolor=#| || bgcolor=#| || Philippines, Vietnam, Cambodia ||  ||  ||
|-
| 28W (Ondoy) ||  || bgcolor=#| || bgcolor=#| || bgcolor=#| || Caroline Islands, Mariana Islands, Philippines || None || None ||
|-
| 29W (Pabling) ||  || bgcolor=#| || bgcolor=#| || bgcolor=#| || Philippines, Malaysia, Brunei, Borneo || None || None ||
|-
| Kajiki (Quedan) ||  || bgcolor=#| || bgcolor=#| || bgcolor=#| || Philippines, Vietnam ||  ||  ||
|-
| 31W ||  || bgcolor=#| || bgcolor=#| || bgcolor=#| || Caroline Islands || None || None ||
|-
| Faxai ||  || bgcolor=#| || bgcolor=#| || bgcolor=#| || Caroline Islands, Mariana Islands ||  ||  ||
|-
| Vamei ||  || bgcolor=#| || bgcolor=#| || bgcolor=#| || Singapore, Malaysia, Sumatra ||  ||  ||
|-

See also

List of Pacific typhoon seasons
2001 Pacific hurricane season
2001 Atlantic hurricane season
2001 North Indian Ocean cyclone season
South-West Indian Ocean cyclone seasons: 2000–01, 2001–02
Australian region cyclone seasons: 2000–01, 2001–02
South Pacific cyclone seasons: 2000–01, 2001–02

Notes

References

External links

Satellite movie of 2001 Pacific typhoon season
Japan Meteorological Agency
China Meteorological Agency
National Weather Service Guam
Hong Kong Observatory
Macau Meteorological Geophysical Services
Korea Meteorological Agency
Philippine Atmospheric, Geophysical and Astronomical Services Administration
Taiwan Central Weather Bureau
Joint Typhoon Warning Center 

 
2001 W